Lee Byung-keun (born 28 April 1973) is a South Korean former footballer and current Manager of South Korean club Suwon Samsung Bluewings.

Lee started his career as a professional footballer as a founding member of Suwon Samsung Bluewings in 1996. He played for Suwon Samsung Bluewings for ten years as one of the most steady players in the team.

He contract to Gyeongnam FC as a scouter in 2008. In 2012, he was named as chief assistant coach of the club.

In 2013, he moved to Suwon Samsung Bluewings as the chief assistant coach of the club. However, he was named caretaker manager of Suwon Samsung Bluewings September 2018. He left the club the following month.

At the beginning of 2019 Season, he joined Daegu FC as the chief assistant coach of the club. However, he was named caretaker manager of Daegu FC on February 5, 2020 to lead the club in the upcoming 2020 K League 1 season.

Club career 
 Suwon Samsung Bluewings 1996–2006
 Daegu FC 2006–2007
 FC Oberneuland 2007–2008
 Seoul United FC 2008

Club career statistics

References

External links
 
 National Team Player Record 
 

1973 births
Living people
Association football midfielders
South Korean footballers
South Korean expatriate footballers
South Korea international footballers
Suwon Samsung Bluewings players
Daegu FC players
FC Oberneuland players
K League 1 players
K3 League players
Expatriate footballers in Germany
South Korean expatriate sportspeople in Germany
Sportspeople from South Gyeongsang Province
Hanyang University alumni
Footballers at the 1998 Asian Games
Asian Games competitors for South Korea